César Octavio Müller Leiva (13 August 1907 – 24 July 1996),, mostly known under the pseudonym Oreste Plath, was a Chilean writer and folklorist. In 1942, he began studying folklore, making trips to neighboring countries like Bolivia, Brazil and Argentina. In 1982, he was elected to the Academia Chilena de la Lengua.

1907 births
1996 deaths
People from Santiago
Academic staff of the University of Chile
Academic staff of the University of Concepción
Chilean folklorists
Chilean male writers
Members of the Chilean Academy of Language